"Bipp" (stylized in all caps) is a song by Scottish, LA-based producer SOPHIE. It was released as a single on 17 June 2013 as SOPHIE's first release on the label Numbers, backed by the B-side "Elle" (also in all caps). Upon release, the song became a critical success, appearing on numerous end-of-year single polls and bringing Sophie early attention.

Reception
"Bipp" received attention from music critics, topping XLR8Rs year-end list of tracks and placing 17 on Pitchfork's list. Pitchfork described the track as "rearranging emblazoned beats and rollercoaster dynamics in favor of vigorous sound design and the sticky hooks," and later ranked "Bipp" 56 on its list of the best tracks from 2010–2014. Resident Advisor described the track as "wet and slippery", and praised its pitched-up vocal, stating that "'Bipp' takes a tired device and revitalizes it through sheer insistence. B-side "Elle" features more chaotic rhythm and synths, drawing comparisons to TNGHT and Rustie.

Track list

Credits
Sophie – production, composition

References

2013 singles
2013 songs
Sophie (musician) songs
Song recordings produced by Sophie (musician)
Songs written by Sophie (musician)